The Hammond House in Calvert, Texas is a two-story Gothic Revival-style building built in 1875.  It was listed on the National Register of Historic Places in 1970.  It is also included in the National Register-listed Calvert Historic District.  The listing includes two contributing buildings.

It was designed by St. Louis architect W.T. Ingraham and has a crenellated parapet.

It is a Recorded Texas Historic Landmark.

It was designed to serve as the courthouse of Robertson County, Texas, but the county seat was moved to Franklin shortly before the building was completed, and it never did serve as a courthouse. The building was documented by the Historic American Buildings Survey.  A set of measured drawings was prepared.

References

External links
Hammond House, 604 Elm Street, Calvert, Robertson County, TX, at HABS

National Register of Historic Places in Robertson County, Texas
Gothic Revival architecture in Texas
Houses completed in 1875